Wiang Pa Pao is the southwesternmost district (amphoe) of Chiang Rai province, northern Thailand.

Geography
Neighboring districts are (from the north clockwise): Mae Suai and Phan of Chiang Rai Province; Wang Nuea and Mueang Pan of Lampang province; Doi Saket and Phrao of Chiang Mai province.

The Khun Tan Range runs along the west side of the district and its highest point, 2,031 m high Doi Mae Tho, is at its southwest end.

History
Wiang Pa Pao was one of the mueang in northern Thailand. In 1905 the District Wiang Pa Pao was merged with Mueang Phong and renamed Mae Suai, while the central area of the old mueang kept the name as the minor district (King Khwaeng) Wiang Pa Pao. In 1907 it was upgraded to a full district.

Administration
The district is divided into seven sub-districts (tambons), which are further subdivided into 92 villages (mubans). There are two sub-district municipalities (thesaban tambons). Wiang Pa Pao covers parts of tambon Wiang, and Mae Khachan covers parts of tambon Mae Chai. There are a further seven tambon administrative organizations (TAO).

References

External links

amphoe.com (Thai)

Wiang Pa Pao